Sperm flagellar protein 1 is a protein that in humans is encoded by the SPEF1 gene.

References

Further reading